Blair's Sauces and Snacks is a United States snack company founded in 1989, most famous for their Death Sauce line of hot sauces, known for their extreme range in Scoville heat ratings.

History of Blair's sauces and snacks
Blair's Sauces and Snacks is a New Jersey-based food company specializing in hot sauces and spicy snacks. Blair has been featured on FoodTV Unwrapped, the History Channel, the Discovery Channel, QVC Japan, Rolling Stone magazine, The Wall Street Journal, the Daily News, the New York Post, and more.

Blair Lazar, founder of Blair's Sauces and Snacks, introduced Death Sauce in 1989 while bartending on the Jersey Shore. He began bottling and distributing this "Original Death Sauce" and a full line of hot sauces later followed (e.g., After Death, Mega Death, Sudden Death).

Blair's Death Sauce
Blair's produces a variety of hot sauces under the brand name Death Sauce. The sauces range from the more modest heat of Sweet Death to the extreme heat of Ultra Death Sauce. The hotter sauces have pepper extract added for additional heat.

Blair's Heat Collection
Blair's Q Heat Collection was a line of sauces used as marinades or dipping sauces. The Heat Sauces included: Habanero Mango, Jalapeño Tequila, Chipotle Slam, and Wasabi Green Tea. The Q Heat Line has been retired since 2018

Reserve Collection
Blair's Reserve Collection includes a selection of award-winning, limited-edition, hand-crafted, signed and numbered bottles. Each Reserve edition commemorates a significant event or experience, beginning with the "A.M." series noted above. This series originated in the early 1990s when Lazar was bartending on the Jersey Shore. Patrons wanting to stay past the 2 am closing time were dared to try "Blair's Wings of Death", made with Blair's Original Death Sauce. Anyone who survived could stay as long as they wanted, thus, giving rise to the remaining items in the "A.M." series (e.g., 3am, 4am, 5am, and 6am Reserves). Other significant reserves include "Caldera," "Blair's Holiday Reserve," "Blair's Halloween Reserve," and "the Firecracker 500 Reserve." All but the 2am and 3am reserves are completely sold-out and are shown in Blair's vault. Collectors have been known to resell their reserve bottles for extremely high sums as per the Blair's website quoting "It has been reported to us that a bottle has recently (late 2004) sold for $5450 (sold in a private sale to a buyer in Europe)."

16 Million Reserve
The strength of Blair's hottest product, "Blair's 16 Million Reserve", is 16 million Scoville units (Tabasco, in comparison, is 2,500 to 5,000 Scoville units). It contains only capsaicin crystals, and is the hottest possible capsaicin-based sauce. Only 999 bottles of "Blair's 16 Million Reserve" were produced, each one signed and numbered by the firm's founder, and have all been sold. This reserve was certified by Guinness World Records as the hottest product available.

References

External links
Blair's Official Site

Companies established in 1989
Snack food manufacturers of the United States
Hot sauces
Condiment companies of the United States